He Lin (born 14 November 1977) is a Chinese actress. In November 2005, she won the International Emmy Award for Best Actress for her starring role in the film Mother (or Slave Mother, adapted from a novel by Rou Shi), and was the first Asian actress to be honored with an Emmy Award.

Filmography

Film

TV series
 1999 - Qian Shou ... Xia Xiaobing
 2000 - Palace of Desire ... Lady of Wei State
 2002 - Qian Wang ... Li Xiangling
 2006 - Ma La Po Xi ... Wu Rui
 2011 - Cai li fu ... Choyleefut Team Assistant
 2014 - Deng Xiaoping at History's Crossroads ...Deng Rong

Awards

References

External links
 

1977 births
Living people
International Emmy Award for Best Actress winners
Chinese television actresses
Chinese film actresses
Chinese stage actresses
21st-century Chinese actresses
20th-century Chinese actresses
Beijing Film Academy alumni
Actresses from Shanghai